Operation Gatling, which took place on 19 October 1978, was a joint-force operation into Zambia launched by the Air Force and Army of Rhodesia; the main forces which contributed were Rhodesian Special Air Service and Rhodesian Light Infantry paratroopers. ZIPRA presumed that Rhodesia would never dare to attack a site so close to Lusaka. About 4,000 guerrillas underwent training at Freedom Camp, with senior ZIPRA staff also on site.

Assaulting targets deep inside Zambia was a first for the Rhodesian forces; previously only guerrillas near the border had been attacked.

Background
Operation Gatling was divided up into three phases when it was being planned by the Rhodesian Security Forces. 
 Phase 1:The first phase of the operation would involve a series of airstrikes by the Air Force against the ZIPRA base situated at Westlands Farm.

 Phase 2:The second phase of the operation would involve an attack by the SAS made on the ZIPRA base at Mkushi, which was approximately 125km north-east of the Zambian capital Lusaka. This attack was planned to commence at exactly the same time as the attack by the Air Force on the camp at Westlands Farm (or Freedom camp as it was called by the insurgents belonging to the ZIPRA).

 Phase 3:The third, and final, phase of the operation would involve an attack by the Rhodesian Light Infantry, the RLI, on another ZIPRA base located near the Great North Road, approximately 15km north of Lusaka. The camp was referred to as the CGT-2 (Communist Guerrilla Training Camp) by the Rhodesians.

The Operation
Led by Squadron Leader Chris Dixon, who identified himself to Lusaka Airport tower as "Green Leader", a Rhodesian Air Force group flew into Zambia at very low altitudes (thereby avoiding Zambian radar) and took control of the country's airspace for about a quarter of an hour during the initial assault on Westlands Farm, informing Lusaka tower that the attack was against "Rhodesian dissidents, and not against Zambia", and that Rhodesian Hawker Hunters were circling the Zambian airfields under orders to shoot down any fighter that attempted to take off. The Zambians obeyed all of Green Leader's instructions, made no attempt to resist and temporarily halted civil air traffic. The Security Forces used the Rufunsa airstrip in eastern Zambia as a forward base against the guerrillas' bases.

Aftermath
During the course of Operation Gatling the RSF suffered only minor casualties during the three-day operation, and afterward claimed to have killed over 1,500 ZIPRA cadres, as well as some Cuban instructors. A further 1,348 were wounded and 198 were missing during the course of the three-day operation. In addition to those losses ZIPRA Logistics Officer Mountain Guru was captured by the security forces.

In comparison, only one member of the SAS, trooper Jeff Collett, had been killed. Three other members of the security forces were wounded during Operation Gatling. Two out of the three men wounded were helicopter pilots Mark Dawson and Roelf Oeloffse, who sustained injuries when their Alouette K-Car was hit by cannon fire, causing it to crash. Dawson suffered injuries to one of his legs and Roelf sustained injuries to his back. In total, the Rhodesians only suffered four casualties and lost one helicopter during the operation.

References

Bibliography

Gatling
1978 in Zambia